The Hunter 23.5 is an American trailerable sailboat that was designed by the Hunter Design Team and first built in 1992.

Production
The design was built by Hunter Marine in the United States between 1992 and 1997, but it is now out of production.

Design
The Hunter 23.5 is a recreational keelboat, built predominantly of fiberglass, with wood trim. It has a fractional sloop rig with a full batten mainsail and a 110% genoa, a raked stem, a walk-through reverse transom, a transom-hung rudder controlled by a metal tiller and a centerboard. It displaces  and carries  of flooding water ballast. The ballast is drained for road transport.

The boat is normally fitted with a small  outboard motor for docking and maneuvering.

Factory standard equipment supplied included a stove, sink, cooler, portable head, a dinette table that can be fitted in the lower deck and the cockpit, outboard motor mount, life jackets, an anchor and a fog bell. Optional equipment included a galvanized highway trailer, a  outboard motor and a canvas companionway cover.

The design has sleeping accommodation for six people, with a double "V"-berth in the bow cabin, two straight settee berths in the main cabin and an aft cabin with a double berth on the starboard side. The galley is located on the port side abeam the companionway ladder. The galley is "L"-shaped and is equipped with a single-burner stove and a sink.

The design has a PHRF racing average handicap of 243 with a high of 249 and low of 231.

Operational history
In a 2010 review Steve Henkel wrote, "the Hunter ... uses water ballast, which automatically pours in as the boat is launched and drains out when the boat is pulled from the water and placed on its trailer. The water is supposed to lighten the hull for easier trailering (which it does), while preserving the boat's stiffness under sail which it doesn't, at least not very well). The water ballast just isn't heavy enough. Best features: There's lots of space compared to comp[etitor]s. Worst features: One disillusioned owner said it all: 'I love Hunter sailboats, but this model heels so rapidly [a result of the water ballast design] that it scared my wife right out of sailing, so I'm out of this sport altogether now.' The same owner pointed out that the handrails were 'weak and easily broken.' One may wonder, after his bad experience with the 23.5, why he 'loves' Hunters. He didn't tell us."

See also
List of sailing boat types

Similar sailboats
Hunter 19-2
Hunter 240
Hunter 260
Hunter 27 Edge
MacGregor 26

References

External links
Official brochure

Keelboats
1990s sailboat type designs
Sailing yachts
Trailer sailers
Sailboat type designs by Hunter Design Team
Sailboat types built by Hunter Marine